Baggersee Lutz is a lake in Baden-Württemberg, Germany, at an elevation of 580 m.

Lakes of Baden-Württemberg